Etlingera triorgyalis is a monocotyledonous plant species that was first described by John Gilbert Baker, and got its current name by Rosemary Margaret Smith. Etlingera triorgyalis is part of the genus Etlingera and the family Zingiberaceae. No subspecies are listed in the Catalog of Life.

References 

triorgyalis
Taxa named by Rosemary Margaret Smith